The Joint Task Force National Capital Region Medical (JTF CapMed), also known as National Capital Region Medical, is located on the Naval Support Activity Bethesda campus in Bethesda, Maryland and was established by Deputy Secretary of Defense Gordon R. England.

History

Establishment
Effective September 14, 2007, Deputy Secretary of Defense Gordon England established the JTF CapMed under command of RADM John Mateczun, MC, USN. This joint task force was established to ensure delivery of military healthcare within the National Capital Region (NCR) using all available military healthcare resources and oversee the consolidation and realignment of military healthcare within the joint operating area (JOA) in accordance with the 2005 Base Realignment and Closure (BRAC) Act.

Disestablishment 
Secretary of Defense Ashton Carter directed in his March 11, 2013 "Implementation of Military Health System Governance Reform " memo directed that JTF CapMed be disestablished effective September 30, 2013.   As a result of the Reform of the Governance of the Military Health System directed by the National Defense Authorization Act for FY2013, the Defense Health Agency (DHA) was created and JTF CapMed was disestablished and its authority, direction, and control over NCR medical facilities and enhanced MSM authorities were transferred to the DHA NCR Medical Directorate.

Authority 
The Commander of the JTF CapMed will act as the senior medical officer in the JOA. The Commander will organize staff and reporting organizations to execute the mission. The Commander shall have the authority to compile budgets for the units assigned to JTF CapMed and distribute and direct resources as needed within the JOA to accomplish mission objectives.

Leadership 
From July to September 2013, the acting Commander of JTF CapMed was then–Rear Admiral Raquel C. Bono, who subsequently served as Director, National Capital Region Medical Directorate of the Defense Health Agency from September 2013 to October 2015. Prior to Bono, Army Major General Steve Jones had commanded the task force since March 2012. Prior to Jones, Navy Vice Admiral John Mateczun, MD, served as the first JTF CapMed commander from Sept. 2007 – March 2012.

JTF CapMed commanders
 VADM John Mateczun, MC, USN (September 2007 – March 2012)
 Major General Steve Jones, USA (acting, March 2012 – July 2013)
 Rear Admiral Raquel C. Bono, MC, USN (acting, July–September 2013)

BRAC Results 
BRAC consolidated four NCR inpatient hospitals into two (Walter Reed National Military Medical Center and Fort Belvoir Community Hospital). To date, this was the most complex and largest Base Realignment and Closure project in the history of the Department of Defense.

Integrated Delivery System 
JTF CapMed working in conjunction with the three Service Commands and the NCR MTFs executed $19.3M installation of an Integrated Healthcare Data Network (JMED) which provides a common desktop and a standardized suite of IT tools for providers across the NCR.

Joint Military Treatment Facilities (MTFs) provide the foundation for the NCR Medical Integrated Delivery System. This is the DoD’s first foray into a multi-service system under a single authority.

Operations 
JTF CapMed has both operational and fiscal control over both – WRNMMC & FBCH, as well as tactical control over the 32 medical clinics within the National Capital Region. This pertains to a staff of more than 9,700 and annual operating budget of $1.35B.

The Future 
Since the completion of BRAC, new construction and facilities were installed at the renamed Walter Reed National Military Medical Center, and a brand new facility was opened in Fort Belvoir, VA — the Fort Belvoir Community Hospital. In March 2012, Army Major General Steve Jones, became the acting Commander of JTF CapMed, having most recently served as the Deputy Commander for JTF CapMed.

Constituent commands 
U.S. Army: Fort Belvoir Community Hospital; Kimbrough Ambulatory Care Center; Dunham U.S. Health Clinic; Barquist Army Health Clinic; Kirk U.S. Army Health Clinic;  Fairfax Health Center; Rader Army Health Clinic; DiLorenzo TRICARE Health Clinic; Dumfries Health Center

U.S. Navy: Walter Reed National Military Medical Center; Naval Health Clinic Quantico; Naval Health Clinic Patuxent River; Naval Health Clinic Annapolis; Naval Health Clinic USUHS; Naval Health Clinic Carderock; Naval Health Clinic Lakehurst; Naval Air Facility Health Clinic Andrews; Naval Health Clinic Willow Grove; Naval Health Clinic Mechanicsburg; Naval Health Clinic Dahlgren; Naval Health Clinic Indian Head; Naval Health Clinic Washington Navy Yard; Naval Health Clinic Earle; Naval Health Clinic Sugar Grove; Philadelphia Naval Business Center Health Clinic

U.S. Air Force: Malcolm Grow Medical Center; 79th Medical Wing; Bolling Air Force Base 579th Health Clinic; 11th Medical Group Flight Medicine Clinic

See also
 Joint Force Headquarters National Capital Region

References

Further reading
 The Journal "A Day of History in Military Medicine" 07/10/08
 The Journal "CO's Column" 07/10/08
 Navy News "New Military Medical Center Underway" 07/03/08
 DoD Military Health System "President Bush Breaks Ground for New Walter Reed Medical Center" 07/03/08
 Navy "New Walter Reed National Military Medical Center Construction Underway" 07/03/08
 Corridor Inc. "Bethesda braces for mega hospital and traffic nightmare" 05/2008
 The Journal "CO's Column" 04/24/08
 The Journal "CO's Column" 04/17/08
 The Journal "CO's Column" 04/03/08
 Washington Post "U.S. Might Pay for Part of Bethesda Road Work" 04/03/2008
 Maryland Department of Veterans Affairs Press Release "Department of Navy Awards Contract for Initial Phase of New Walter Reed National Military Medical Center Project" 03/03/08
 Washington Post "Military Hospitals Meet New Realities" 02/10/2008
 The Journal "CO's Column" 01/17/08
 The Journal "CO's Column" 01/10/08
 The Journal "General Discusses base realignment issues at town hall" 01/10/08
 Psychiatric News "Psychiatrist, Navy Admiral Faces Challenge of His Career" 01/04/08
 The Journal "CO's Column" 12/20/07
 The Journal "CO's Column" 11/01/07
 The Journal "General discusses issues at town hall" 08/30/07
 The Journal "Joint Task Force Oversees Region" 11/01/07
 The Journal "Medical Conference Speeds Up the Integration Process" 10/18/07

References
 JTF CapMed Official Website
 JTF CapMed Official Facebook page
 JTF CapMed Official Twitter page
 JTF CapMed Official Flickr page

Joint task forces of the United States Armed Forces
Military medicine in the United States